Greg Gary (born November 10, 1958 in Albany, Indiana) is a former professional gridiron football linebacker and the former head coach for the University of Toronto's football team, the Varsity Blues. Gary became Toronto's head coach in 2011 after serving as the team's linebackers coach in 2008. As a professional player, he played for one season with the Los Angeles Rams of the National Football League and for four seasons with the Hamilton Tiger-Cats of the Canadian Football League, where he won a Grey Cup championship. Collegiately, he played college football for the Cal State Fullerton Titans.

References

External links
Toronto Varsity Blues profile

1958 births
African-American players of Canadian football
Cal State Fullerton Titans football players
Canadian football linebackers
Hamilton Tiger-Cats players
Living people
People from Albany, Indiana
Toronto Varsity Blues football coaches
21st-century African-American people
20th-century African-American sportspeople